The 1916 Liverpool East Toxteth by-election was a parliamentary by-election held in England on 21 February 1916 for the House of Commons constituency of Liverpool East Toxteth.

Vacancy
The by-election was caused by the appointment of the Conservative Member of Parliament (MP), Edward Marshall Hall as the Recorder of Guildford. The Recorder's role as a part-time judge disqualified him from sitting in Parliament, and his acceptance of the post automatically caused a vacancy, and Hall accepted the appointment after checking with the Liverpool Conservatives that a by-election would not be problematic for them.

The writ of election for the by-election was moved in the Commons on 10 February by William Bridgeman, the MP for Oswestry.

Candidates
The Conservatives had already selected Captain James Stuart Rankin as their prospective candidate for the next general election.

The 36-year-old Rankin, who was then serving in Liverpool with the Royal Field Artillery, was formally adopted on 14 February as the Conservative candidate for the by-election. During World War I, the major political parties had agreed not to contest by-elections when seats held by their respective parties fell vacant, and the Toxteth Liberals accepted Rankin's nomination. They did not nominate a candidate of their own.

Since Rankin was the only candidate, he was returned unopposed.

Aftermath 
At the next general election, in 1918, Rankin was re-elected unopposed as a Coalition Conservative. He held the seat until he stood down at the 1924 general election,

References

See also
 Liverpool East Toxteth constituency
 Toxteth
 1895 Liverpool East Toxteth by-election
 1902 Liverpool East Toxteth by-election
 1929 Liverpool East Toxteth by-election
 1931 Liverpool East Toxteth by-election
 List of United Kingdom by-elections (1900–1918)

1916 elections in the United Kingdom
East Toxteth, 1916
1916 in England
Toxteth
1910s in Liverpool
February 1916 events